Qin Jiwei (16 November 1914 – 2 February 1997) was a general of the People's Republic of China, Minister of National Defense and a member of the Chinese Communist Party Politburo.

Qin Jiwei was born to a poor peasant family in Huang'an (now Hong'an), Hubei Province of China in November 1914.

Combat
Qin joined a Hebei guerrilla band after the failed Autumn Harvest Uprising, and spent his earliest years in the military under the leadership of Xu Haidong and Xu Xiangqian, and alongside future generals Chen Zaidao and Xu Shiyou. After a series of setbacks, the unit Qin served in was redesignated the 31st Division, Red 11th Corps.

The Fourth Front Army participated in the Long March as a separate unit from the main force under Zhou Enlai and Mao Zedong. At the close of the Long March, Xu Xiangqian's Right Column (to which Qin, Chen Xilian and Li Xiannian were assigned) were shattered by Muslim cavalry in a battle that might have turned out differently had Mao Zedong not abandon Fourth Front Army commander Zhang Guotao. One story has Qin and future general secretary Hu Yaobang captured in the battle and held prisoner for a year or so before finding an opportunity to escape.

In 1939, Qin was commander of the 1st Military Sub-District of the Jinjiyu Military Region and at the end of the Sino-Japanese War, Chief-of-Staff of the Taihang Military District. His units were organized into the 9th Column in 1947, and later combined with Chen Geng's 4th Column into the 4th Army of the 2nd Field Army (二野), this Army’s leader is Deng Xiaoping. In 1949, Qin commanded the 4th Army’s 15th Corps.

Battle of Triangle Hill
Qin Jiwei gained fame during the Korean War by commanding the 15th Corps at the Battle of Triangle Hill, which is regarded by the Chinese as one of the decisive engagements of the war.

Domestic assignments
In the 1954 reorganization that established 13 Military Regions, Xie Fuzhi was given command of the Kunming MR and Qin was made deputy commander. He was awarded the rank of Lt. General in 1955 and eventually, he became a member of the National Defense Council (1965-75), and commander of the Kunming Military Region (1960-67) and Sichuan Military Region (1973-76). In 1975, he was named political commissar of the Beijing MR, and in 1980-87 was its commander. It was in this role that he commanded the September 1981 field military parade in the Hebei Province and the 1984 National Day parade commemorating the 35th anniversary of the founding of the People's Republic of China. In the latter post, Qin took over from two of the so-called 'Small Gang of Four', commander Chen Xilian and political commissar Ji Dengkui.

Qin was a member of the 10th, 11th, 12th and 13th Central Committees. In 1977, he was named to the party Military Affairs Committee and a decade later, as one of only two military officers named to the politburo (the other was Yang Shangkun). In September 1988, Qin was promoted to full general and made Defense Minister, until 1990.

Spring 1989

In May 1989, Qin was reported to be reluctant to use force against protesters in Tiananmen Square in Beijing. On 17 May 1989, Qin, as Defense Minister and politburo member, attended a meeting at the home of paramount leader Deng Xiaoping, and was directed to impose martial law on the demonstrators in Tiananmen Square. Qin declined to do so immediately, citing the need to receive party approval.  Deng was the chairman of the party's Central Military Commission, but Zhao Ziyang, as general party secretary, was nominally head of the party.  After the meeting, Qin called Zhao's office, hoping that Zhao would call off the martial law order. He waited four hours until early morning on 18 May, for Zhao's reply, which never came. Qin later publicly supported the military crackdown but was stripped of the defense minister position the following year. At his death in February 1997, his only official post was Vice Chairman of the National People's Congress.

References 

1914 births
1997 deaths
Ministers of National Defense of the People's Republic of China
People's Liberation Army generals from Hubei
Politicians from Huanggang
Chinese Communist Party politicians from Hubei
People's Republic of China politicians from Hubei
Political commissars of the Beijing Military Region
Deputy commanders of the Yunnan Military District
Commanders of the Beijing Military Region
Commanders of the Chengdu Military Region
Commanders of the Kunming Military Region
Members of the 13th Politburo of the Chinese Communist Party
State councillors of China
Vice Chairpersons of the National People's Congress
Burials at Babaoshan Revolutionary Cemetery